The 2019 U.S. Cellular 250 is a NASCAR Xfinity Series race held on July 27, 2019, at Iowa Speedway in Newton, Iowa. Contested over 250 laps on the  D-shaped oval, it was the 19th race of the 2019 NASCAR Xfinity Series season.

Background

Track

The track was designed with influence from Rusty Wallace and patterned after Richmond Raceway, a short track where Wallace was very successful. It has over 25,000 permanent seats as well as a unique multi-tiered Recreational Vehicle viewing area along the backstretch.

Entry list

Practice

First practice

Final practice

Qualifying

Qualifying results

Race

Summary
Christopher Bell started on pole and lead for the first 49 laps. The first cautions occurred when Justin Allgaier and Austin Cindric both hit the wall on lap 45. Bell won stage 1 ahead of Cole Custer. On lap 75, Riley Herbst spun and collected Jeremy Clements. Stage 2 was also won by Bell, whose strong lead continued.

In the later half of the race, David Starr and Cole Custer each ended up hitting the wall on separate instances and brought out cautions. With 48 laps to go, Michael Annett brought out a caution after spinning in turn 2. On lap 219, the caution was thrown for fluid on the track. Cleaning trucks were in the entrance of pit road when the drivers began pitting, and Dillon Bassett crashed into the rear of one of the trucks, heavily damaging his car.

In the final moments of the race, Chase Briscoe raced hard with Tyler Reddick and John Hunter Nemechek, eventually leaving them behind while Bell's lead increased. With 5 laps remaining, Briscoe caught up to Bell, driving alongside him before taking the lead due to better cornering. Briscoe was able to hold off Bell to score his first win of the year.

Stage Results

Stage One
Laps: 60

Stage Two
Laps: 60

Final Stage Results

Stage Three
Laps: 130

References

2019 in sports in Iowa
U.S. Cellular 250
NASCAR races at Iowa Speedway
2019 NASCAR Xfinity Series